Man, Moment, Machine is a television series which aired on The History Channel and was hosted by Hunter Ellis. It documented an important event in history and went into detail about, as the title suggests, the man and his background, the machine and how it was made, and the outcome.

Episodes

Season 1

Hunting Bonnie and Clyde
The Great Sub Rescue
Doolittle's Daring Raid
Stormin' Norman and the Abrams Tank
Shot Down: The U-2 Spyplane
Mine Rescue Mask
Wernher von Braun and the V2 Rocket
Thomas Edison and the Electric Chair
Howard Hughes and the Spruce Goose
Ultimate Weapon: Oppenheimer and the Atomic Bomb
The Higgins Landing Craft
Dam Buster: World War II's Bouncing Bomb
25,000 Miles non-stop: Voyager Spacecraft
Sikorsky and the Rescue Chopper

Season 2

Apollo 13: Triumph on the Dark Side
Patton and the Desperate Tank Attack
Alexander the Great and the Torsion Catapult
Al Capone and the Machine Gun Massacre
Stormin' Norman and the Stealth Fighter
Lincoln and the Flying Spy Machine
Alexander Graham Bell and the Astonishing Telephone
Da Vinci and the Handgun
The Red Baron and the Wings of Death
Saddam Hussein and the Nerve Gas Atrocity
Galileo and the Sinful Spy Glass
Enzo Ferrari and the Historic Race
JFK and the Crisis Crusader

External links 

2005 American television series debuts
2006 American television series endings
History (American TV channel) original programming